Bellizzi is a surname. Notable people with the surname include:

Domenico Bellizzi (1918–1989), Albanian poet
Dominick Bellizzi ( 1912–1934), American jockey
Mario Bellizzi (born 1957), Italian poet

See also
Belluzzi

Italian-language surnames